Kasa may refer to

Places
Kasa (kingdom), a former kingdom in Senegal
Kasa, Sweden, a village in northern Sweden
Kasa District, Kyoto, a district in Kyoto, Japan
Kasa Khurd, a village in Maharashtra, India
Kasa-Vubu (commune), a district in the Kinshasa, Congo

Radio and television stations
KASA (AM), a radio station at 1540 AM licensed to Phoenix, Arizona, United States
KASA-TV, a television station (channel 27, virtual 2) licensed to Santa Fe, New Mexico, United States

People
Joseph Kasa-Vubu, first president of Congo
Lady Kasa, Japanese poet
Nadasi Kasa, ancient Iranian princess
Tamás Kásás, Hungarian water polo player

Other uses
Gasa (poetry), a form of Korean poetry
Kasa (hat), a Japanese hat
Kasa-obake, a spirit or monster in Japanese folklore
 Kibera Aeronautics and Space Academy, a project of the Tunapanda Institute, Nairobi, Kenya

See also
 
 Kassa (disambiguation)
 Casa (disambiguation)